"Drop the Pilot" is a song written and originally performed by Joan Armatrading. It was the first single to be released from Armatrading's 1983 album The Key, and was her third and (to date) final UK top 40 hit. It reached number 11 in the UK Singles Chart, and spent a total of ten weeks in the Top 40.

The song was a major hit in Australia and New Zealand, peaking at number 6 on both charts. The single was Armatrading's only appearance on the Billboard Hot 100, where it spent six weeks, peaking at number 78 on 25 June 1983.

B-side 
The original song "Business is Business" is featured as its B-side, a track that remains unreleased on any album.

Track listing
7" Single
 "Drop the Pilot" – 3:39
 "Business Is Business" – 3:08

Chart

Weekly charts

Year-end charts

Mandy Moore version 

"Drop the Pilot" is a song recorded by American singer Mandy Moore, for her third studio album Coverage (2003). Moore's version was released as the second single from her third album on 28 October 2003 through Epic Records. The song was written by Joan Armatrading and produced by John Fields.

Music video
A video was produced as a demo for Kodak's Vision2 500T series motion picture film. It is included on the demo DVD for the Vision2 line of stocks and used as a product example projected from a print at Kodak product screenings. The video was directed by Nick DiBella.

Track listing
Digital download
 "Drop the Pilot" – 3:39

References

External links
"Drop the Pilot" lyrics from Joan Armatrading's official website

1983 songs
1983 singles
2003 singles
Joan Armatrading songs
Mandy Moore songs
Songs written by Joan Armatrading
A&M Records singles
Epic Records singles